Lemyra pilosa is a moth of the family Erebidae first described by Walter Rothschild in 1910. It is found in the Khasia Hills of India and Yunnan, China.

References

Moths described in 1910
pilosa